Pocrí District is a district (distrito) of Los Santos Province in Panama. The population according to the 2000 census was 3,397. The district covers a total area of 280 km2. The capital lies at the city of Pocrí, Los Santos.

Administrative divisions
Pocrí District is divided administratively into the following corregimientos:

Pocrí (capital)
El Cañafístulo
Lajamina
Paraíso
Paritilla

References

Districts of Panama
Los Santos Province